La Chapelle-Gauthier may refer to the following communes in France:

La Chapelle-Gauthier, Eure, in the Eure département 
La Chapelle-Gauthier, Seine-et-Marne, in the Seine-et-Marne département